Lieutenant General Nigar Johar Khan  is a retired three-star general in the Pakistan Army. Nigar is the first and only woman in the history of  Pakistan Army to reach the rank of Lieutenant-General, and the third to reach the rank of major-general. She belongs to the Pakistan Army Medical Corps and served as the surgeon general of Pakistan Army and Colonel commandant of Army Medical Corps. The other five women major-generals Shahida Badsha, Shahida Malik, Shehla Baqai, Abeera Chaudhry and Shazia Nisar also belong to the Army Medical Corps.

In 2015, she was featured in an Inter-Services Public Relations (ISPR) video honoring women in the Pakistan Armed Forces. At the time, she was the deputy commandant of the Combined Military Hospital (CMH), Rawalpindi. In the video, she says, "Pakistan is my country and I was born here. I was raised here and I think there is no match to Pakistan to anywhere in the world," while adding, "Think of all the Muslim countries, think of all those developing nations. This is the only country which has had female general officers. No one else," she added.

Education and background
Johar was born in Panjpir village in the Swabi District of Khyber Pakhtunkhwa province to a Pashtun family. Her father, Qadir, was an army colonel. Both her parents along with her two younger sisters died in a car accident in 1989. Her husband, Johar, an engineer in the military, died in 2019 due to cancer. 

Johar completed her schooling through the Presentation Convent Girls High School, Rawalpindi in 1978. She joined the Army Medical College (AMC) in 1981, graduating in 1985. She is from the 5th MBBS course of the Army Medical College and has served as a female company commander of Ayesha Company at the same college. In 2010, she completed the examination for membership of the College of Physicians and Surgeons Pakistan. In 2012, she completed her diploma in Advance Medical Administration through the Armed Forces Post Graduate Medical Institute and in 2015 received a Master of Public Health degree from the same institute.

Military career
On 30 June 2020 she was promoted to lieutenant general and appointed as Surgeon General of Pakistan Army. In 2015, she was the deputy commandant of the Combined Military Hospital Rawalpindi. On 9 February 2017, Johar was among the 37 brigadiers who were promoted to the rank of major general. Approval for her promotions was given at an Army Selection Board meeting which was presided over by then Chief of Army Staff General Qamar Javed Bajwa. She served as vice principal of Army Medical College. She also served as the commandant of Pak-Emirates Military Hospital, Rawalpindi.

Popular culture

Mahira Khan portrayed Nigar in Aik Hai Nigaar, a 2021 Urdu language biographical telefilm about her life. The telefilm was directed by Adnan Sarwar and was premiered on 23 October 2021 on ARY Digital.

Awards and decorations

References

Living people
Place of birth missing (living people)
Year of birth missing (living people)
Female army generals
Pakistan Army officers
Pakistani female military officers
Pakistani generals
Pakistani military doctors
Pashtun women
People from Swabi District
Women academic administrators